Iranshahr Airport  (Balochi: ایرانشہربالی پَٹ) is an airport serving Iranshahr, Iran.

Airlines and destinations

References

Airports in Iran
Buildings and structures in Sistan and Baluchestan Province
Transportation in Sistan and Baluchestan Province